Eva Piquer i Vinent (born in Barcelona on May 30, 1969) is a Catalan writer and journalist. She is the director and editor-in-chief of the cultural magazine Catorze.

Biography

Career in journalism and teaching 
She has worked as a correspondent in New York City (1992–1994) and has taught journalism at the Autonomous University of Barcelona (1994–2001). She received the Atlàntida award in 2006 for the best columnist in the Catalan language. She was deputy head of culture and coordinator of the cultural supplement of Avui newspaper, where she worked from 1988 to 2010. She has written culture, politics and society chronicles in the newspaper Ara. She has also written in La Vanguardia, El Periódico, Time Out Barcelona, Nació Digital, Catalan International View, ONGC and others. From 1992 to 2022, she collaborated with Catalunya Ràdio. In 2014 she created the cultural digital publication Catorze, which was awarded the 15th LletrA Award for digital projects in 2015 and the National Prize for Culture, considered the most important distinction in the field of culture in Catalonia, in 2018.

Career in publishing 
As literary director of the publishing house Thassalia (1995–1997), she published books by Kate Atkinson, Daniel Pennac, Anita Brookner, Alexander Jardin, Barbara Trapido, Jerome Charyn, Rachel Cusk, Ann Beattie i Kingsley Amis, among others. She was part of the collective Germanes Quintana.

Literary works

Individually 

 1996 — La noia del temps. El Vaixell de Vapor. Cruïlla, 1997.
 1997 — Què pensa Mikimoto?
 1999 — Alícia al país de la televisió
 2002 — Una victòria diferent
 2003 — No sóc obsessiva, no sóc obsessiva, no sóc obsessiva: Dèries, plaers i addiccions d'una lectora desacomplexada
 2004 — Els fantasmes no saben nedar
 2005 — Supermare treballadora i altres estafes
 2010 — La feina o la vida. Certeses (provisionals) d'una mare desacomplexada
 2012 — Petita història de Barcelona
 2014 — Catorze de cara al 2014
 2014 — Marta Rovira, cada dia més a prop
 2018 — Evasions. Illustrated by Eva Armisén.
 2021 – Com abans de tot. Illustrated by Eva Armisén.
 2023 – Aterratge

Collectively 

 1998 — Zel
 2000 — Por
 2001 — Domèstics i salvatges
 2003 — Tancat per vacances (with Sebastià Alzamora, Lluís Calvo, Miquel de Palol i Muntanyola, Gemma Lienas, Andreu Martín, Isabel Olesti, Maria Mercè Roca, Care Santos and Lluís Maria Todó)

Awards and recognitions 

 1996 Vaixell de vapor for La noia del temps.
 1999 Ciutat d'Olot-Marià Vayreda for Alícia al país de la televisió.
 2002 Josep Pla for Una victòria diferent.
 2006 Atlàntida award for the best columnist in the Catalan language.

References 

1969 births
Living people
Catalan women
Journalists from Catalonia
Women writers from Catalonia